Redhead Kingpin and the F.B.I. was an American hip hop/new jack swing group best known for its debut single and  highest-charting song, "Do the Right Thing" from its album A Shade of Red, which peaked at No. 13 on the UK Singles Chart in 1989. The song was featured on the soundtrack of Wes Craven's horror film The People Under the Stairs.

Career
The group was led by emcee David "Redhead" Guppy (an actual redhead), who also played keyboards. The F.B.I. consisted of Joseph "D.J. Wildstyle" Mann, Bo Roc, Lt. Squeak, Buzz, and Poochie.

A Shade of Red contained two other singles, "Pump It, Hottie", which reached No. 2 on the US Hot Rap Singles Chart in 1990, and "We Rock the Mic Right". The album was produced by Redhead and Markell Riley from the duo Wreckx-N-Effect (the younger brother of producer Teddy Riley)  and was heavily influenced by the new jack swing trend at the time.

In 1991, the group released its second and final album, The Album with No Name. Recorded at Hillside Studios, Englewood, New Jersey, and Soundtracks Studios, New York, The Album with No Name peaked at No. 182 on the Billboard 200, while the song "3-2-1 Pump" reached No. 52 on the Billboard Hot 100.

The group also appeared on a track of the soundtrack of the 1991 film New Jack City. That same year, Guppy made his acting debut in the film Strictly Business, which also starred Halle Berry.

In 1992, Guppy co-wrote the song "Two Can Play That Game", which was recorded by Bobby Brown on his album, Bobby.

In 1993, Redhead Kingpin returned with Gicci Brown, D.J. Wildstyle, and Knowledge to form a new group called Private Investigators. Private Investigators had a harder-edged hip hop sound, and released one album titled React Like Ya Knew on Virgin/EMI.

In 2000, Redhead Kingpin produced a track on the Nutty Professor II: The Klumps soundtrack entitled "No (You Didn't Say)" by Kandice Love.

In 2006, Redhead Kingpin was featured on the Nas single "Where Are They Now."

Discography

Albums

Singles

References

External links
 
 "Do the Right Thing" Video
 "Mash up the Mic" by Private Investigators Video

Virgin Records artists
American hip hop groups
New jack swing music groups
Five percenters